Francis James Baird Wheen (born 22 January 1957) is a British journalist, writer and broadcaster.

Early life and education
Wheen was born into an army family and educated at two independent schools: Copthorne Preparatory School near Crawley, West Sussex, and Harrow School in north west London.

Career

Running away from Harrow at 16 "to join the alternative society," Wheen had early periods as a "dogsbody" at The Guardian and the New Statesman and attended Royal Holloway College, University of London, after a period at a crammer. At Harrow, he was briefly a contemporary of Mark Thatcher who has been a subject of his journalism.

Wheen is the author of several books, including a biography of Karl Marx which won the Deutscher Memorial Prize in 1999, and has been translated into twenty languages. He followed this with a notional "biography" of Das Kapital, which follows the creation and publication of the first volume of Marx's major work as well as other incomplete volumes. Wheen had a column in The Guardian for several years. He writes for Private Eye and is currently the magazine's deputy editor. His collected journalism, Hoo-hahs and Passing Frenzies, won him the Orwell Prize in 2003. He has also been a regular columnist for the London Evening Standard.

In April 2012, Wheen suffered the loss of his entire book collection, his "life's work", and an unfinished novel, in a garden shed fire.

Broadcasting work
Wheen broadcasts regularly, mainly on BBC Radio 4, has made many appearances on The News Quiz, in which he has often referred to the fact that he resembles the former Conservative Party leader Iain Duncan Smith. He has also several times been a guest on Have I Got News for You.

Wheen wrote a docudrama, The Lavender List, for BBC Four on the final period of Harold Wilson's premiership, concentrating on his relationship with Marcia Williams, which first screened in March 2006. It starred Kenneth Cranham as Wilson and Gina McKee as Williams. In April 2007, the BBC paid £75,000 to Williams (then Baroness Falkender) in an out-of-court settlement over claims made in the programme.

Political views
Wheen was opposed to the Falklands War. In an article syndicated
to a number of American newspapers, Wheen stated: "In a famous British play of the 1950s, Look Back in Anger, the hero complained that 'there aren't any good, brave causes to fight for anymore'. Mrs Thatcher apparently agrees with this view, so she went to war over a small, ignoble cause." Wheen is a supporter of the anti-monarchist group Republic.

Wheen supported NATO's Kosovo intervention in 1999, signed the Euston Manifesto for a realignment of progressive politics and supported the second Iraq War.

In late 2005, Wheen was the co-author with David Aaronovitch and blogger Oliver Kamm, both contributors to The Times, of a complaint to The Guardian after it published an apology and correction in respect of an interview with Noam Chomsky by Emma Brockes which had been published at the end of October 2005; Chomsky had complained that the interview was defamatory in suggesting that he denied the 1995 Srebrenica massacre by his defence of a book by Diana Johnstone.

Francis Wheen was intensely critical of Foreign Office minister Baroness Anelay's failure to condemn the torture of Raif Badawi by the government of Saudi Arabia in 2016. Wheen maintained that Anelay's approach was motivated by her wish to sell arms to the Saudi régime.

Personal life
Wheen was married to the writer Joan Smith between 1985 and 1993. He has been the partner for 27 years of Julia Jones (formerly Julia Thorogood) since the mid-1990s whom he married in 2019; they have two sons.

In 2014, Wheen waived his right to anonymity in order to speak about being a victim of Charles Napier, one-time treasurer of the defunct Paedophile Information Exchange, after the former teacher was convicted of sexually abusing 23 boys between 1967 and 1983. Wheen described his experience as less serious than that of other victims, and had only become aware of the scale of Napier's activities later.

Wheen was a close friend of the writer Christopher Hitchens.

Partial bibliography
The Sixties (1982) 
Television: A History (1984) 
Battle for London (1985) 
Tom Driberg: His Life and Indiscretions (1990) 
The Chatto Book of Cats (Chatto Anthologies) Francis Wheen, editor, John O'Connor, illustrator (1993)  
Lord Gnome's Literary Companion (1994) 
Karl Marx (1999) 
Who Was Dr. Charlotte Bach? (2002) 
Hoo-hahs and Passing Frenzies: Collected Journalism, 1991–2001 (2002)  (mainly consisting of columns written for The Guardian)
The Irresistible Con: The Bizarre Life of a Fraudulent Genius (2004)  
Shooting Out the Lights (2004)   
How Mumbo-Jumbo Conquered the World (2004) ; in the US and Canada: Idiot Proof: A Short History of Modern Delusions (2004) 
Marx's Das Kapital: A Biography (2006)  
Strange Days Indeed: The Golden Age of Paranoia (2009)

References

External links
Extract from Hoo-Hahs and Passing Frenzies: Collected Journalism

1957 births
Living people
Alumni of Royal Holloway, University of London
British male journalists
English atheists
British republicans
People educated at Copthorne Preparatory School
People educated at Harrow School
Private Eye contributors
The Guardian journalists
Deutscher Memorial Prize winners